Ohvida is a genus of Caribbean wandering spiders first described by D. Polotow & Antônio Brescovit in 2009.

Species
 it contains nine species:
Ohvida andros Polotow & Brescovit, 2009 – Bahama Is.
Ohvida bimini Polotow & Brescovit, 2009 – Bahama Is.
Ohvida brevitarsus (Bryant, 1940) – Cuba
Ohvida coxana (Bryant, 1940) – Cuba
Ohvida fulvorufa (Franganillo, 1930) (type) – Cuba
Ohvida isolata (Bryant, 1940) – Cuba
Ohvida modesta (Bryant, 1942) – Puerto Rico
Ohvida turquino Polotow & Brescovit, 2009 – Cuba
Ohvida vernalis (Bryant, 1940) – Cuba

References

Araneomorphae genera
Ctenidae
Spiders of the Caribbean
Taxa named by Antônio Brescovit